The Miss Earth BiH (Bosne i Hercegovine) pageant is a national beauty pageant in Bosnia and Herzegovina and has been held since 2010. It is responsible for selecting the country's representative to Miss Earth, which is an annual international beauty pageant promoting environmental awareness.

History

2002-2009: Miss Bosne i Hercegovine
Bosnia and Herzegovina debuted in Miss Earth in 2002. It was acquired by a 1994 born franchise, Miss Bosne i Hercegovine. Miss Bosne i Hercegovine is also responsible in sending winners to Miss World pageant. The first ever titleholder of Miss Earth BiH is Dzejla Glavovic who subsequently won the Miss Earth crown in 2002. However, Džejla was the first Miss Earth pageant winner to be dethroned on May 28, 2003. Carousel Productions, the pageant organizer, cited her failure to fulfill her duties as the main reason for her unseating. First runner-up from Kenya, Winfred Omwakwe, took over the position of Miss Earth 2002.

2010-present: Miss Earth BiH
Metropola Media, a company based in Slovenia, acquired the franchise of Miss Earth in 2010. The franchise is headed by its current national director, Drago Gavranovic. Miss Earth BiH is responsible for sending a delegate in Miss Earth since 2010.

Titleholders
Color key

See also
 Miss Bosne i Hercegovine

References

Bosnia and Herzegovina
Beauty pageants in Bosnia and Herzegovina
Recurring events established in 2010
2010 establishments in Bosnia and Herzegovina
Bosnia and Herzegovina awards